Ryoga Terayama (born 19 January 2004) is a Japanese kickboxer, currently competing in the bantamweight division of RISE.

As of August 2021 he was the #10 ranked Strawweight kickboxer in the world by Combat Press.

Kickboxing career
Terayama made his professional debut against Ryo Miyakawa at RISE 135 on November 4, 2019. He won the fight by unanimous decision, with all three judges scoring the fight 30–27 in his favor.

Terayama was scheduled to face Shoa Arii at Stand Up Kickboxing vol.1 on December 22, 2019. The fight was ruled a draw by unanimous decision, with all three judges scoring the fight as 29–29.

Terayama was scheduled to face Naoya Kuroda at RISE 137 on February 23, 2020. The fight was ruled a majority draw, with one of the three judges scoring the fight in Terayama's favor.

Terayama was scheduled to make his promotional debut with DEEP KICK against Yuma at DEEP KICK 44 on July 26, 2020. He won the fight by a second-round technical knockout, stopping his opponent in the very last second of the round. He was afterwards scheduled to fight HΛL, for the DEEP KICK -53kg title, at DEEP KICK 47 on September 21, 2020. Terayama won the fight by unanimous decision. He thoroughly dominated his opponent and was accordingly awarded wide scorecards of 30–25, 30–26 and 30–26.

Terayama returned to RISE for his next fight. He was scheduled to fight a rematch with Shoa Arii at RISE Dead or Alive Osaka on November 1, 2020. Arii won the closely contested fight by majority decision, with scores of 30–29, 29–29 and 30–29.

Terayama was scheduled to fight the veteran Yuki Kyotani at RISE 149 on May 23, 2021. The fight was ruled a draw, after an extension round was fought.

Terayama participated in the Shooto 53kg Cage Kick tournament, held at Shooto 2021 Vol.4 on July 4, 2021. He was scheduled to face Keito Naito in the tournament quarterfinals. He won the fight by unanimous decision. Terayama won the semifinal bout against Kanta Tabuchi in the same manner. Terayama fought a trilogy bout with Shoa Arii in the tournament finals. He won their third meeting by split decision, after an extension round was fought.

Terayama was scheduled to make his first title defense against the #3 ranked DEEP KICK contender Yuma at DEEP☆KICK 56 on September 23, 2021. The two previously fought at DEEP KICK 44 on July 26, 2020, with Terayama winning their first meeting by a second-round technical knockout. Terayama won the fight by a dominant decision, with all three judges awarding him a 30-25 scorecard.

Terayama faced Hiroki at Rizin 32 - Okinawa on November 20, 2021. He won the bout via unanimous decision.

Terayama was scheduled to face Takuya at RISE 154 on January 23, 2022. Terayama was later forced to withdraw, due to a close contact with a COVID-19 infected person. 

On February 15, 2022, Terayama announced his departure from the Teppen gym. Terayama was booked to face Kyosuke at RISE 162 on October 30, 2022, and prepared for it as the BeWell gym. He won the fight by unanimous decision.

Terayama faced Koki Osaki in the main event of RISE 165 -RISE 20th Memorial event- on February 23, 2923. Terayama suffered an inadvertent low blow at the 1:54 minute mark of the third round, which left him unable to continue competing. The fight was ruled a draw by technical decision.

Titles and accomplishments

Professional
 2021 Shooto Cage Kick Championship Tournament Winner 
 2020 DEEP KICK -53kg Champion 

Amateur
 2018 WBC Muay Thai All Japan Jr. League -50kg Runner-up
 2018 J-NETWORK All Japan Middle School -50kg Champion 
 2018 KAMINARIMON All Japan -55kg Champion 
 2018 Bigbang -50kg Champion
 2017 Dageki Kakutougi Japan Cup Middle School -45kg Runner-up 
 2017 Bigbang -45kg Champion
 2017 Bigbang -40kg Champion 
 2016 KAMINARIMON All Japan -40kg Champion 
 2015 SMASHERS -30kg Champion
 2014 J-GROW Jr League Tournament Winner 
 2014 Bigbang -28kg Champion

Fight record

Professional

|-  style="background:#c5d2ea;"
| 2023-02-23 || Draw ||align=left| Koki Osaki || RISE 165 -RISE 20th Memorial event-|| Tokyo, Japan || Tech. Decision (Majority) || 3 ||
|-
|-  style="background:#cfc;"
| 2022-10-30|| Win ||align=left| Kyosuke|| RISE 162 || Tokyo, Japan || Decision (Unanimous) || 3 || 3:00 
|-  style="background:#cfc;"
| 2021-11-20|| Win ||align=left| Hiroki || Rizin 32 - Okinawa || Okinawa, Japan || Decision (Unanimous) || 3 ||3:00 
|-  style="background:#cfc;"
| 2021-09-23|| Win ||align=left| Yuma || DEEP☆KICK 56 || Izumiōtsu, Japan || Decision (Unanimous) || 3 || 3:00
|-
! style=background:white colspan=9 |
|-  style="background:#cfc;"
| 2021-07-04|| Win ||align=left| Shoa Arii ||  Shooto 2021 Vol.4 – Cage Kick Championship, Final  || Osaka, Japan || Ext.R Decision (Split) || 4 || 3:00
|-
! style=background:white colspan=9 |
|-  style="background:#cfc;"
| 2021-07-04|| Win ||align=left| Kanta Tabuchi ||  Shooto 2021 Vol.4 – Cage Kick Championship, Semi Final  || Osaka, Japan || Decision (Unanimous) || 3 || 3:00
|-  style="background:#cfc;"
| 2021-07-04|| Win ||align=left| Keito Naito || Shooto 2021 Vol.4 – Cage Kick Championship, Quarter Final  || Osaka, Japan || Decision (Unanimous) || 3 || 3:00
|-  style="background:#c5d2ea;"
| 2021-05-23|| Draw ||align=left| Yuki Kyotani || RISE 149 || Tokyo, Japan || Ext.R Decision (Unanimous) || 4 || 3:00
|-  style="background:#fbb;"
| 2020-11-01|| Loss ||align=left| Shoa Arii || RISE Dead or Alive Osaka || Osaka, Japan || Decision (Majority) ||3  ||3:00
|-  style="background:#cfc;"
| 2020-09-21||Win ||align=left| HΛL || DEEP KICK 47  || Osaka, Japan ||Decision (Unanimous)||3 ||3:00  
|-
! style=background:white colspan=9 |
|-  style="background:#cfc;"
| 2020-07-26|| Win ||align=left| Yuma || DEEP KICK 44  || Osaka, Japan || TKO (Punches) || 2 || 2:59
|-  style="background:#c5d2ea;"
| 2020-02-23|| Draw|| align=left| Naoya Kuroda || RISE 137 || Tokyo, Japan || Decision (Majority) ||3 || 3:00
|-  style="background:#c5d2ea;"
| 2019-12-22|| Draw|| align=left| Shoa Arii || Stand Up Kickboxing vol.1 || Tokyo, Japan || Decision (Unanimous) ||3 || 3:00
|-  style="background:#cfc;"
| 2019-11-04|| Win || align=left| Ryo Miyakawa || RISE 135|| Osaka, Japan || Decision (Unanimous)  ||3 || 3:00
|-
| colspan=9 | Legend:

Amateur

|-  style="background:#cfc;"
| 2019-06-02|| Win || align=left| Touma Ogura || KAMINARIMON || Tokyo, Japan || Decision (Unanimous) ||2 ||2:00
|-  style="background:#cfc;"
| 2019-04-14|| Win || align=left| Ryo Miyakawa || KAMINARIMON || Tokyo, Japan || Decision (Unanimous) ||2 ||2:00
|-  style="background:#cfc;"
| 2019-04-14|| Win || align=left| Yasuhiko Nemoto || KAMINARIMON || Tokyo, Japan || Decision (Unanimous) ||2 ||2:00
|-  style="background:#cfc;"
| 2018-12-02|| Win || align=left| Ryuto Kimura || KAMINARIMON All Japan Tournament -55kg Final|| Tokyo, Japan || Decision (Unanimous) ||2 ||2:00
|-
! style=background:white colspan=9 |
|-  style="background:#cfc;"
| 2018-12-02|| Win || align=left| Towa Yamaguchi || KAMINARIMON All Japan Tournament -55kg Semi Final|| Tokyo, Japan || Decision (Split) ||2 ||2:00
|-  style="background:#cfc;"
| 2018-10-21|| Win || align=left| Shoma Ozaki || KAMINARIMON || Tokyo, Japan || Decision (Unanimous) ||2 ||2:00
|-  style="background:#cfc;"
| 2018-10-21|| Win || align=left| Kousei Kanai || KAMINARIMON || Tokyo, Japan || KO ||2 ||
|-  style="background:#fbb;"
| 2018-08-05|| Loss || align=left| Ryu Hanaoka || WBC Muay Thai All Japan Junior League, Final || Tokyo, Japan || Decision ||2 ||1:30
|-
! style=background:white colspan=9 |
|-  style="background:#cfc;"
| 2018-08-05|| Win || align=left| Sora Funamoto || WBC Muay Thai All Japan Junior League, Semi Final || Tokyo, Japan || Decision ||2 ||1:30
|-  style="background:#fbb;"
| 2018-07-08 || Loss ||align=left| Ryu Hanaoka || NJKF Explosion 16, WBC Muay Thai Jr League Selection Tournament, Final ||  Tokyo, Japan ||Decision || 2 || 1:30
|-  style="background:#cfc;"
| 2018-05-27|| Win || align=left| Eiji Katsura || J-NETWORK All Japan Tournament Middle School -50kg Final|| Tokyo, Japan || Decision (Majority) ||2 ||2:00
|-
! style=background:white colspan=9 |
|-  style="background:#cfc;"
| 2018-05-27|| Win || align=left| Ritsuki Shibasawa || J-NETWORK All Japan Tournament Middle School -50kg Semi Final|| Tokyo, Japan || KO ||1 ||1:54
|-  style="background:#fbb;"
| 2017-10-09|| Loss || align=left| Riku Kazushima || Amateur Dageki Kakutougi Japan Cup 2017, Final || Tokyo, Japan || Decision (Unanimous) || 2 || 1:30 
|-
! style=background:white colspan=9 |
|-  style="background:#cfc;"
| 2017-10-09|| Win || align=left|  || Amateur Dageki Kakutougi Japan Cup 2017, Semi Final || Tokyo, Japan || Decision  || 1 || 2:00
|-  style="background:#cfc;"
| 2017-10-09|| Win || align=left| Ryunosuke Saito  || Amateur Dageki Kakutougi Japan Cup 2017, Quarter Final || Tokyo, Japan || Decision  || 1 || 2:00
|-  style="background:#cfc;"
| 2017-09-03|| Win || align=left| Jinto Tokoro || Bigbang Amateur 42|| Tokyo, Japan || Decision ||3 ||1:30
|-
! style=background:white colspan=9 |
|-  style="background:#cfc;"
| 2017-07-09|| Win || align=left| Eiji Katsura || Bigbang Amateur 41|| Tokyo, Japan || Decision ||3 ||1:30
|-
! style=background:white colspan=9 |
|-  style="background:#c5d2ea;"
| 2017-06-25|| Draw || align=left| Ryugo Komiyama || J-FIGHT 2017～J-NETWORK 20th Anniversary～2nd|| Tokyo, Japan || Decision ||2 ||2:00
|-  style="background:#cfc;"
| 2017-06-04|| Win || align=left| Tenma Nagai || Bigbang Amateur 40|| Tokyo, Japan || Decision (Majority) ||2 ||1:30
|-  style="background:#cfc;"
| 2017-06-04|| Win || align=left| Ren Ogawa || Bigbang Amateur 40|| Tokyo, Japan || Decision (Unanimous) ||2 ||1:30
|-  style="background:#cfc;"
| 2017-05-28|| Win || align=left| Riku Otsu || J-FIGHT＆J-GIRLS 2017～J-NETWORK 20th Anniversary～3rd|| Tokyo, Japan || Decision (Unanimous) ||2 ||2:00
|-  style="background:#fbb;"
| 2017-04-16|| Loss || align=left| Akiyuki Tanitsu || NJKF Explosion 10|| Japan || Decision ||2 ||1:30
|-  style="background:#cfc;"
| 2017-04-02|| Win || align=left| Jinto Tokoro || Bigbang Amateur|| Tokyo, Japan || Decision (Unanimous) ||3 ||1:30
|-
! style=background:white colspan=9 |
|-  style="background:#fbb;"
| 2017-03-05|| Loss || align=left| Yusei Shirahata || NJKF Explosion || Japan || Ext.R Decision ||4 ||1:30

|-  style="background:#cfc;"
| 2017-02-26|| Win|| align=left| Toki Ōshika|| KAMINARIMON || Tokyo, Japan || Decision (Unanimous) ||2 ||2:00

|-  style="background:#cfc;"
| 2016-12-11|| Win || align=left| Kouga Kitakuni || KAMINARIMON All Japan -40kg Tournament Final|| Tokyo, Japan || Decision (Unanimous) ||2 ||2:00
|-
! style=background:white colspan=9 |
|-  style="background:#cfc;"
| 2016-12-11|| Win || align=left| Ryu Hanaoka || KAMINARIMON All Japan Tournament -40kg Semi Final|| Tokyo, Japan || Decision (Split) ||2 ||2:00
|-  style="background:#cfc;"
| 2016-09-04|| Win || align=left| Keishin Watanabe || Bigbang Amateur 36|| Tokyo, Japan || Decision (Unanimous) ||2 || 1:30
|-  style="background:#cfc;"
| 2016-07-10|| Win || align=left| Taiju Nozaki || Bigbang Amateur 35|| Tokyo, Japan || KO ||1 ||
|-  style="background:#fbb;"
| 2016-04-29|| Loss || align=left| Jinto Tokoro || JAKF SMASHERS 179|| Tokyo, Japan || Decision (Unanimous) || ||
|-
! style=background:white colspan=9 |
|-  style="background:#cfc;"
| 2016-03-20|| Win || align=left| Keishin Watanabe || JAKF SMASHERS 178, Final|| Tokyo, Japan || Decision (Unanimous) ||2 ||1:30
|-  style="background:#cfc;"
| 2016-03-20|| Win || align=left| Ryoma Wakatsuki || JAKF SMASHERS 178, Semi Final|| Tokyo, Japan || Decision (Unanimous) ||2 ||1:30

|-  style="background:#cfc;"
| 2016-02-28|| Win || align=left| Toki Ōshika|| KAMINARIMON || Tokyo, Japan || Decision (Unanimous) ||2 ||2:00

|-  style="background:#cfc;"
| 2016-02-21|| Win || align=left| Rui Sugiyama || Bigbang Amateur 32|| Tokyo, Japan || Decision (Unanimous) ||2 ||2:00
|-  style="background:#cfc;"
| 2016-02-21|| Win || align=left| Narumi Hen || Bigbang Amateur 32|| Tokyo, Japan || Decision (Unanimous) ||2 ||2:00
|-  style="background:#cfc;"
| 2016-02-07|| Win || align=left| Raize Umemoto || NJKF EXPLOSION 4|| Tokyo, Japan || Decision  ||2 ||1:30
|-  style="background:#fbb;"
| 2015-12-06|| Loss || align=left| Jinto Tokoro || Bigbang Amateur 31|| Tokyo, Japan || Decision ||2 ||2:00
|-  style="background:#fbb;"
| 2015-07-19|| Loss || align=left| Ryocihi Sato || JAKF 175|| Tokyo, Japan || Decision ||2 ||2:00
|-  style="background:#c5d2ea;"
| 2015-06-14 || Draw||align=left| Aliyakare Yamamoto|| JAKF SMASHERS 174 ||  Tokyo, Japan ||Decision || 2 || 1:30
|-  style="background:#c5d2ea;"
| 2015-06-07|| Draw|| align=left| Shimon Yoshinari || Bigbang Amateur 25|| Tokyo, Japan || Decision ||2 ||1:30
|- style="background:#cfc;"
| 2015-05-10|| Win || align="left" | Shura Shigihara || Bigbang Amateur 28 ||Tokyo, Japan|| Decision || 2 || 1:30
|-  style="background:#fbb;"
| 2015-04-29 || Loss ||align=left| Ryu Hanaoka || NJKF Explosion ||  Tokyo, Japan ||Decision || 2 || 1:30
|- style="background:#fbb;"
| 2015-03-29|| Loss || align="left" | Akiyuki Tanitsu || Bigbang Amateur 27 ||Tokyo, Japan|| Decision (Unanimous) || 2 || 1:30
|-  style="background:#cfc;"
| 2015-03-22 || Win||align=left| Taisuke Yamada|| JAKF SMASHERS 170 ||  Tokyo, Japan ||TKO || 2 ||  
|-
! style=background:white colspan=9 |
|-  style="background:#fbb;"
| 2015-02-15|| Loss || align=left| Jinto Tokoro || Bigbang Amateur 26|| Tokyo, Japan || Decision ||3 ||1:30
|-
! style=background:white colspan=9 |
|-  style="background:#fbb;"
| 2014-12-13|| Loss|| align=left|  || JAKF SMASHERS Tournament, Semi Final|| Tokyo, Japan || Decision || ||
|-  style="background:#cfc;"
| 2014-12-13|| Win|| align=left|  || JAKF SMASHERS Tournament, Quarter Final|| Tokyo, Japan || Decision || ||
|- style="background:#cfc;"
| 2014-12-07|| Win || align="left" | Ryohei Watanabe || Bigbang Amateur 25 ||Tokyo, Japan|| Decision || 3 || 1:30 
|-
! style=background:white colspan=9 |
|-  style="background:#cfc;"
| 2014-11-30 || Win||align=left| Shibasawa || TENKAICHI Fight || Tokyo, Japan || Decision (Unanimous) || 2 || 2:00
|- style="background:#cfc;"
| 2014-09-07|| Win || align="left" | Shota Ide || Bigbang Amateur 23 ||Tokyo, Japan|| Ext.R Decision || 3 || 1:30 
|-
! style=background:white colspan=9 |
|-  style="background:#cfc;"
| 2014-08-24|| Win|| align=left| Sora Mochizuki || J-GROW 44～Oomori Survival 2014～, Final|| Tokyo, Japan || KO ||1 ||
|-  style="background:#cfc;"
| 2014-08-24|| Win|| align=left| Shota Torigoe || J-GROW 44～Oomori Survival 2014～, Semi Final|| Tokyo, Japan || KO ||1 ||
|-  style="background:#c5d2ea;"
| 2014-06-22|| Draw || align=left| Shota Torigoe || J-GROW in SHINJUKU～vol.4～|| Tokyo, Japan || Decision ||2 ||1:30
|-  style="background:#cfc;"
| 2014-06-01|| Win ||align=left| Takuma Urata || Bigbang Amateur 21 || Tokyo, Japan ||  Decision ||  || 
|-
| colspan=9 | Legend:

See also
 List of male kickboxers

References

2004 births
Living people
Japanese male kickboxers
Sportspeople from Gunma Prefecture
21st-century Japanese people